2022 Indoor Hockey World Cup may refer to:

2022 Men's FIH Indoor Hockey World Cup
2022 Women's FIH Indoor Hockey World Cup